Following is a list of notable Dalit people organised by profession, field, or focus.

Academics 
B.R. Ambedkar, economist and reformer
Meghnad Saha, Indian astrophysicist who developed the Saha ionization equation
Narendra Jadhav, economist, writer and educationist
Satyendra Murli, researcher, media pedagogue and journalist
Sukhadeo Thorat, economist and Padma Shri recipient

Cinema and television 
 Chirag Paswan, actor and politician 
 Kalabhavan Mani, actor and singer
 Pa. Ranjith, director and filmmaker
P.K. Rosy, first heroine in Malayalam cinema
 Tun Tun, actress and comedian of Hindi cinema
 Neeraj Ghaywan, director
 Nagraj Manjule, director

Activists 
 Lahuji Raghoji Salve, freedom fighter 
 Anand Teltumbde
 Ayyankali, Indian social reformer
 Gopal Baba Walangkar
 Immanuvel Sekaran
Kuyili, freedom fighter and Commander in Chief of Velu Nachiyar
Meena Kandaswamy, poet and Dalit activist
Rettamalai Srinivasan
Uda Devi, freedom fighter

Politicians

Presidents 
K. R. Narayanan, 10th president of India (1997–2002) and 9th vice president of India (1992–1997)
Ramnath Kovind,  14th President of India

Prime Ministers 
 Jagjivan Ram, Dalit leader, deputy prime minister of india, Indian freedom fighter and founder of Depressed Class Association

Speakers of Lok Sabha 
 G. M. C. Balayogi, 14th Speaker of Lok Sabha and MP of Amalapuram
 Meira Kumar, Speaker of Lok Sabha
Suraj Bhan, Deputy Speaker of Lok Sabha, Governor of Himachal Pradesh and UP, Bihar

Members of Parliament (Lok Sabha and Rajya Sabha) 
B. R. Ambedkar, first Law minister, and father of the Indian constitution
 Jogendra Nath Mandal, one of the central figures in creation of the state of Pakistan; later a government minister
 Ram Vilas Paswan, 11 times Member of Parliament and many times Minister in Central Government; founder and President of Lok Janshakti Party
 Sushilkumar Shinde, Chief Minister Of Maharashtra and Union Minister of Home Affairs (India)
Prakash Yashwant Ambedkar, President of Vanchit Bahujan Aaghadi, former Parliamentarian
 Ashok Tanwar, President of Haryana Congress, former Member of Parliament
Ram Ratan Ram, Member of Parliament 1984-1989, MLA and Minister in Bihar State 1952-1984

Chief Ministers 
 Damodaram Sanjivayya, 2nd Chief Minister of Andhra Pradesh
Ram Sundar Das, Chief Minister, Bihar
Bhola Paswan Shastri, Chief Minister of Bihar
Jagannath Pahadia, Chief Minister of Rajasthan
Mayawati, Chief Minister of Uttar Pradesh
 Charanjit Singh Channi, 16th Chief Minister of Punjab

Members of the State Legislative assembly/council (MLA and MLC)
 Yashwant Ambedkar, Member of Maharashtra Legislative Council
 P T Madhale, Freedom Fighting Leader Along With Bharat Ratna Dr. B R Ambedkar, First Dalit MLA

Others 
Kanshi Ram, founder of Bahujan Samaj Party, a Dalit leader and Bahujan Nayak of India
Bangaru Laxman, President of Bharatiya Janta Party
Kirpa Ram Punia, Dalit leader, former IAS officer, and politician
 B. Shyam Sunder, founder of Bharatiya Bhim Sena

Literature 

Annabhau Sathe, Indian Writer 
Baburao Bagul, Marathi writer
Kanwal Bharti, writer
Bilat Paswan Vihangam, Maithili literature
Daya Pawar, Marathi writer who received Padma Shri
Heera Dom, Bhojpuri poet
Lal Singh Dil, Punjabi poet
Namdeo Dhasal, Marathi poet and writer from Maharashtra
Neerav Patel, first Dalit poet to write poetry in English
Om Prakash Valmiki, Hindi poet and writer
P. Sivakami, Dalit-feminist Tamil writer
Yashica Dutt, Indian writer and journalist

Music 
Chamkila
Sumeet Samos

Religion and reform 
Bhagu, devotee of Rama
Chokhamela
Gallela Prasad, fourth bishop of the Roman Catholic Diocese of Cuddapah, in the state of Andhra Pradesh in India
 Harichand Thakur, established the Matua sect of Vaishnavite Hinduism
Marampudi Joji, third Archbishop of Hyderabad

References 

Lists of people by association